Crawling Stone Lake is a 1,483 acre lake in Vilas County, Wisconsin. It has a maximum depth of 87 feet. Fish in the lake include Muskellunge, Panfish, Largemouth Bass, Smallmouth Bass, Northern Pike and Walleye. Little Crawling Stone Lake is attached through a small inlet on the south western side of the lake.

See also 
 List of lakes in Wisconsin
 List of lakes in Vilas County, Wisconsin

References

Lakes of Wisconsin
Lakes of Vilas County, Wisconsin